is a Japanese animation studio established by former Gonzo members.

History
Studio Gokumi, literally meaning "Studio Group 5", was founded in May 2010 after members of Gonzo's Studio Number 5 left the company to start one of their own. Studio Number 5 was responsible at Gonzo for the anime series Strike Witches and Saki.

Studio Gokumi's first production was an original video animation for Koe de Oshigoto! at the end of 2010. In spring 2011, A Channel debuted as the first anime television series for the studio. Production of Saki was taken over by Studio Gokumi for the Saki: Achiga-hen season, which aired from April 9 to July 2, 2012.

Works

Television series

Films

OVAs

References

External links
 

 
Japanese animation studios
Animation studios in Tokyo
Japanese companies established in 2010
Mass media companies established in 2010
Suginami